The butterflyfish are a group of conspicuous tropical marine fish of the family Chaetodontidae; the bannerfish and coralfish are also included in this group. The approximately 129 species in 12 genera are found mostly on the reefs of the Atlantic, Indian, and Pacific Oceans.  A number of species pairs occur in the Indian and Pacific Oceans, members of the huge genus Chaetodon.

Butterflyfish look like smaller versions of angelfish (Pomacanthidae), but unlike these, lack preopercle spines at the gill covers. Some members of the genus Heniochus resemble the Moorish idol (Zanclus cornutus) of the monotypic Zanclidae. Among the paraphyletic Perciformes, the former are probably not too distantly related to butterflyfish, whereas the Zanclidae seem far less close.

Description and ecology

The common name references the brightly coloured and strikingly patterned bodies of many species, bearing shades of black, white, blue, red, orange, and yellow. Other species are dull in colour. Butterflyfish are a boundless, different group of marine percoids with delegates on practically all coral reef frameworks and in every single tropical ocean. Their bright and color patterns have drawn in much consideration, creating an abundance of data about their conduct and environment. Many have eyespots on their flanks and dark bands across their eyes, not unlike the patterns seen on butterfly wings. Their deep, laterally narrow bodies are easily noticed through the profusion of reef life. The conspicuous coloration of butterflyfish may be intended for interspecies communication. Butterflyfish have uninterrupted dorsal fins with tail fins that may be rounded or truncated, but are never forked.

These corallivores are especially territorial, forming pairs and staking claim to a specific coral head. Contrastingly, the zooplankton feeders form large conspecific groups. By night, butterflyfish hide in reef crevices and exhibit markedly different coloration.

Their coloration also makes them popular aquarium fish. However, most species feed on coral polyps and sea anemones. Balancing the relative populations of prey and predator is complex, leading hobby aquarists to focus on the few generalists and specialist zooplankton feeders.

Butterflyfish are pelagic spawners; that is, they release many buoyant eggs into the water, which become part of the plankton, floating with the currents until hatching. The fry go through a tholichthys stage, wherein the body of the postlarval fish is covered in large, bony plates extending from the head. They lose their bony plates as they mature. Only one other family of fish, the scats (Scatophagidae) express such an armored stage.

Taxonomy, systematics and evolution
The Chaetodontidae can be, but are not usually, divided into two lineages that arguably are subfamilies. The subfamily name Chaetodontinae is a little-used leftover from the period when the Pomacanthidae and Chaetodontidae were united under the latter name as a single family. Hence, Chaetodontinae is today considered a junior synonym of Chaetodontidae. In any case, one lineage of Chaetodontidae (in the modern sense) contains the "typical" butterflyfish around Chaetodon, while the other unites the bannerfish and coralfish genera. As the Perciformes are highly paraphyletic, the precise relationships of the Chaetodontidae as a whole are badly resolved.

Chaetodontidae is classified within the suborder Percoidei by the 5th edition of Fishes of the World, but they are placed in an unnamed clade which sits outside the superfamily Percoidea. This clade contains 7 families which appear to have some relationship to Acanthuroidei, Monodactylidae, and Priacanthidae. Other authorities have paced the family in the order Chaetodontiformes alongside the family Leiognathidae.

Before DNA sequencing, the taxonomy was confused about whether to treat these as species or subspecies. Also, numerous subgenera have been proposed for splitting out of Chaetodon, and it is becoming clear how to subdivide the genus if that is desired.

The fossil record of this group is marginal. Their restriction to coral reefs means their carcasses are liable to be dispersed by scavengers, overgrown by corals, and any that do fossilize will not long survive erosion. However,  Pygaeus, a very basal fossil from the mid- to late Eocene of Europe, dates from around the Bartonian 40–37 million years ago (Mya). Thus, the Chaetodontidae emerged probably in the early to mid-Eocene. A crude molecular clock in combination with the evidence given by Pygaeus allows placement of the initial split between the two main lineages to the middle to late Eocene, and together with the few other fossils, it allows the deduction that most living genera were probably distinct by the end of the Paleogene 23 Mya.

Genera
The bannerfish-coralfish lineage can be further divided in two groups; these might be considered tribes, but have not been formally named. Genera are listed in order of the presumed phylogeny, from the most ancient to the youngest:

Bannerfish/coralfish lineage 1:
 Amphichaetodon Burgess, 1978
 Coradion Kaup, 1860
 Chelmon Cloquet, 1817
 Chelmonops Bleeker, 1876

Bannerfish/coralfish lineage 2:
 Forcipiger Jordan & McGregor, 1898
 Hemitaurichthys Bleeker, 1876
 Heniochus Cuvier, 1816
 Johnrandallia Nalbant, 1974

The "typical" butterflyfishes may eventually come to contain more genera; see Chaetodon:
 Chaetodon Linnaeus, 1758
 Parachaetodon Bleeker, 1874
 Prognathodes Gill, 1862
 Roa Jordan, 1923

Timeline

Gallery

Further reading
 Pratchett, Morgan S. & Berumen, Michael L. & Kapoor, B.G. [Editors] : Biology of Butterflyfishes. CRC Press, 2014.

References
General

  (2007): Molecular phylogenetics of the butterflyfishes (Chaetodontidae): Taxonomy and biogeography of a global coral reef fish family. Mol. Phylogenet. Evol. 45(1): 50–68.  (HTML abstract)
  [2008]: Family Chaetodontidae – Butterflyfishes. Retrieved 2008-SEP-02.
  (2007): Molecular phylogeny of Chaetodon (Teleostei: Chaetodontidae) in the Indo-West Pacific: evolution in geminate species pairs and species groups. Raffles Bulletin of Zoology Supplement 14: 77–86. PDF fulltext
  (2002): [Chaetodon]. In: A compendium of fossil marine animal genera. Bulletins of American Paleontology 364: 560. HTML database excerpt

Specific

 
Articles which contain graphical timelines
Extant Maastrichtian first appearances
Taxa named by Constantine Samuel Rafinesque